Belvedere is an unincorporated community in Wayne Township, Jefferson County, Ohio, United States.

Silence of the Lambs

The town figures into the plot of the movie Silence of the Lambs.

References

Unincorporated communities in Jefferson County, Ohio